Bewick may refer to:

Bewick, East Riding of Yorkshire, a deserted village in Aldbrough parish, England
Bewick, Northumberland, a civil parish in England
Old Bewick
Bewick Island, Queensland, Australia
Bardowick (Bewick in Low Saxon), a municipality in Lüneburg, Lower Saxony, Germany
Bewick (surname), includes a list of people with that name
Bewick's swan, Cygnus bewickii
Bewick's wren, Thryomanes bewickii

See also
Berwick (disambiguation)
Buick (disambiguation)